White Pass (elev. ) is a mountain pass in the northwest United States, in the Cascade Range of Washington, southeast of Mount Rainier and north of Goat Rocks.  U.S. Highway 12 travels over White Pass, connecting Yakima County on the east with Lewis County. It was named after Charles A. White, a surveying engineer who led the party that discovered it for the Northern Pacific Railroad in 1878.

A shortcut route across White Pass between Packwood and Naches was first established  as State Road 5 in 1931, and the link was completed in August 1951 along the current route, later designated U.S. Route 12.

White Pass Ski Area, at the summit, opened on January 11, 1953.  Champion ski racing twins Phil and Steve Mahre (and their seven siblings) grew up on White Pass, where their father Dave Mahre was the mountain manager for the ski area. White Pass is also the home mountain of professional snowboarder Marc Frank Montoya, owner of the Block Hotels.

On October 7, 2007, a single-engine Cessna Caravan crashed near White Pass while carrying skydivers; all 10 people aboard died in the crash.

References

External links 
White Pass road conditions
White Pass Scenic Byway - official site
Ski White Pass.com - trail map for the ski area
Experience Washington.com - White Pass Scenic Byway

Landforms of Yakima County, Washington
Landforms of Lewis County, Washington
White
Mountain passes of the Cascades
Transportation in Yakima County, Washington
Transportation in Lewis County, Washington
Gifford Pinchot National Forest